Pring may refer to:

Boeng Pring, a khum (commune) of Thma Koul District, Battambang Province, Cambodia
Daniel Pring (1788–1846), officer in the British Royal Navy
Martin Pring (1580–1626), English explorer
John Pring (1927-2014), New Zealand rugby union referee

See also
 Princess Pring, a Korean media franchise